Alexander Henry Campbell (31 July 1822 – ?) was a British Conservative politician.

He was the justice of the peace for Hertfordshire, and held the office of deputy lieutenant of Cornwall. In 1865 he was elected member of parliament for Launceston, a position he held until he resigned in 1868.

Campbell once owned Little Grove, a house in Hertfordshire that he sold to Sigismund James Stern.

References

Charles Mosley, editor, Burke's Peerage, Baronetage & Knightage, 107th edition, 3 volumes (Wilmington, Delaware, U.S.A.: Burke's Peerage (Genealogical Books) Ltd, 2003), volume 1, page 854.

External links 
 

1822 births
Conservative Party (UK) MPs for English constituencies
Deputy Lieutenants of Cornwall
UK MPs 1865–1868
Members of the Parliament of the United Kingdom for Launceston
Year of death unknown
English justices of the peace